Greatest Hits is the second greatest hits album by saxophonist Kenny G. It was released by Arista Records in 1997 and peaked at number one on the Contemporary Jazz Albums chart, number 15 on the R&B/Hip-Hop Albums chart and number 19 on the Billboard 200.

Production
The album combined Kenny G's hits since the beginning of his career. Shortly after the release of the album, the blockbuster film Titanic was released, and having already produced the hit single of My Heart Will Go On performed by Celine Dion, producer Afanasieff returned to the studio with Kenny G to produce an instrumental version of the Love Theme from Titanic.

This recording was released as a single and was bundled with the Greatest Hits as a promotional item. The cover is a photograph from the Greatest Hits booklet with water superimposed over the top. The packaging for the single declared itself to be 'The first instrumental version available of this classic theme for all time'. Since this first release, it has appeared on every Kenny G greatest hits compilation.

Track listing

Charts

Weekly charts

Year-end charts

Certifications and sales

References

1997 greatest hits albums
Albums produced by Phil Ramone
Albums produced by David Foster
Albums produced by Walter Afanasieff
Kenny G compilation albums
Arista Records compilation albums